Florence Piron (1966 – 26 April 2021) was a French-born Canadian anthropologist and ethicist. She was full professor in the Department of Communication and Information at Laval University. She also acted as a Knight of the International Order of Academic Palms of CAMES (OIPA-CAMES). Her focus was on open access to knowledge and to enhance the scientific "heritage" of places like Africa and Haiti.

Piron died on 26 April 2021 at the age of 54.

References

External links

Canadian women academics
French women academics
Canadian ethicists
1966 births
2021 deaths
Place of birth missing
Place of death missing
French ethicists
Academic staff of Université Laval
French emigrants to Canada